Per-Olof Erixon (born 23 January 1952) is a retired Swedish football defender.

Originally from Danderyds SK, Erixon represented Djurgården 1971–77. Erixon made 72 Allsvenskan appearances for Djurgården and scored 1 goals. He made three appearences for the Sweden national under-19 football team in 1969.

References

External links 
 

Swedish footballers
Djurgårdens IF Fotboll players
Allsvenskan players
Association footballers not categorized by position
Year of birth missing
Sweden youth international footballers